Anything Can Happen is a 1952 American comedy-drama film directed by George Seaton, starring José Ferrer and Kim Hunter.

José Ferrer stars as Giorgi Papashvily, who emigrates from Georgia in the Soviet Union to the United States and gradually becomes Americanized.  Based on a 1945 best-selling biographical novel by Helen and George Papashvily, the film also stars Kim Hunter, fresh from her Oscar-winning turn in A Streetcar Named Desire.

Plot

Papashvily is an immigrant who arrives for initial immigrant inspection on Ellis Island, and starts taking jobs on New York's bustling Lower East Side.  His friend, Nuri (Kurt Kasznar), who had arrived in New York earlier and speaks English, leads the way, telling Giorgi that he'll help him get an outdoor job with plenty of fresh air.  Instead, they find themselves carrying buckets and pouring hot tar on rooftops.

Giorgi, who didn't speak a word of English when he arrived, works diligently to learn the language, practicing troublesome consonants ("W" and "V") in the mirror.  He also shares a house with fellow Georgians.  Cited by the police with some of his fellow countrymen for picking flowers in Central Park, he refuses to pay the fine because he didn't pick the flowers (although he was present) and it would be wrong to admit to a crime he did not commit.

Appearing before the judge on principle, he explains what happened.  The judge, taken by his honesty and obvious character, finds him not guilty after the arresting police officer admits that he didn't actually see Giorgi pick any flowers.  The judge shakes Giorgi's hand, thanking him for brightening his courtroom.

Giorgi has also caught the eye of the pretty court reporter, Helen Watson (Kim Hunter), who is equally moved by Giorgi's simple but eloquent defense. She invites him over to her house because her hobby is recording folk music and she wants Giorgi to identify some music.  It turns out that Giorgi has a pretty good voice as well.  A fast but proper friendship develops between Helen and Giorgi.

Helen has also recorded another musician who turns out to be Georgi's "Uncle John" (Oscar Beregi, Sr.) a friend from the old country and now a chef in New York, who Giorgi has been looking for since his arrival.  Giorgi moves into Uncle John's house which he shares with a colorful group of fellow Georgian emigres.  Giorgi dreams of becoming a U.S. citizen and noticing the hints from Helen (she calls him "darling"), also dreams of marrying her.  But he lacks a bit of self-confidence in the area of romance.

A few comic scenes ensue, notably one about an expanding loaf of dough, which Nuri understandably mispronounces as "duff" (i.e. "enough," "rough")  There are further scenes of immigrant life.  Just when Giorgi is about to reveal his feelings for Helen, at the behest of Uncle John, she announces that she needs to go to California to look after a sick aunt who raised her.  She promises to be back shortly.  She leaves Giorgi with a plant to take care of for her.

Weeks turn into months and Uncle John encourages Giorgi to go out to California.  When he hesitates, Uncle John quits his job at the restaurant and announces he is going to California and asks Giorgi if he would like to come.  Soon the whole household picks up and decamps to Southern California, where they connect with a reclusive fellow Georgian.  Meanwhile, something appears to have changed with Helen, who has taken a job.  Giorgi purchases a house and farm he can't afford and becomes an orange tree farmer.

He still hasn't asked Helen to marry him. She confesses to her bedridden aunt that she doesn't feel a cold chill down her back with Giorgi and doesn't want to marry anyone until she is sure. The aunt discourages Helen's romanticism, telling her that she can get that chill from a cold shower.  A past romance is discussed, which apparently didn't end well.  A frost comes and threatens to ruin the orange crop.  Helen rushes out to the farm and orders everyone to stop standing around and to light fires to keep the crop warm.  Giorgi, deeply moved, asks Helen to marry him.  She immediately says yes.  Nuri and his friends arrive in a car from New York and Giorgi reveals the news.  Uncle John becomes ill and a judge gives him a citizenship test and he becomes a citizen, dying shortly thereafter.

Cast
 José Ferrer as Giorgi
 Kim Hunter as Helen
 Kurt Kasznar as Nuri Bey
 Oscar Beregi, Sr. as Uncle John
 Eugenie Leontovich as Anna
 Oskar Karlweis as Uncle Besso
 Mikhail Rasumny as 	Tariel Godiedze
 Nick Dennis as 	Chancho
 Gloria Marlowe as Luba Godiedze
 Otto Waldis as Sandro
 George Voskovec as 	Pavli
 Alexander Danaroff as Eliko Tomavily
 Natasha Lytess as 	Madame Greshiani

Reception
Bosley Crowther of The New York Times panned the film, writing that Seaton had "borrowed and invented a series of episodes that are quaintly sentimental and romantic but they have the strong flavor of myth. Furthermore, they are strung together in such a loose and senseless way and are played with such calculated cuteness that the monotony of them palls." Variety called it "a heart-warming comedy, engagingly acted, slickly produced and directed." "A pleasant, heart-warming comedy drama," agreed Harrison's Reports. "Much of the picture's charm and warmth stems from the sympathetic characterizations, particularly that of Jose Ferrer, who does an outstanding job as the immigrant." John McCarten of The New Yorker called the film "somewhat superficial," adding, "There are funny scenes, and if broken English amuses you, you might find more of the film palatable than I did. However, I'm afraid things go entirely too sweetly for this immigrant to make for much suspense, and the accent José Ferrer uses in the role of the hero makes him sound more Chinese than Georgian."

Anything Can Happen won a Golden Globe Award for Promoting International Understanding.

References

External links
 

1952 films
1952 comedy-drama films
American comedy-drama films
Films about immigration to the United States
Films based on American novels
Films directed by George Seaton
Films scored by Victor Young
Films set in California
Films set in New York City
Georgian-American culture
Paramount Pictures films
American black-and-white films
Films produced by William Perlberg
1950s English-language films
1950s American films
English-language comedy-drama films